Shujeo Shyam (born 1946) is a Bangladeshi music director. The following is a list of films he scored:

filmography

Year unknown

Background score only

References

Sources
 

Discographies of Bangladeshi artists